Race for the Yankee Zephyr (also known as Treasure of the Yankee Zephyr) is a 1981 action adventure film directed by David Hemmings and starring Ken Wahl, Lesley Ann Warren, George Peppard and Donald Pleasence.

Plot
Gibbie Gibson (Donald Pleasence) has discovered a World War II-era plane wreck in the mountains of New Zealand.  When his discovery gets around town, Gibson, his daughter Sally (Lesley Ann Warren), and his lodger Barney Whitaker (Ken Wahl) find trouble from a group of treasure hunters led by a Mister Theo Brown (George Peppard), who are intent on finding the cache of money they believe is on the wreck.

Cast 
Barney Whitaker (Ken Wahl) — A hunter who owns a helicopter and lives with Gibbie Gibson. He is the nemesis of Theo Brown who kidnaps Gibbie and Barney eventually falls in love with Gibbie's daughter Sally Carson.

Sally Carson (Lesley Ann Warren) — A receptionist who is the daughter of Gibbie Carson. She is caught up between the war between Gibbie's lodger Barney Whitaker and his rival Theo Brown, but eventually falls in love with Barney.

Theo Brown (George Peppard) — A gangster who is the arch rival of Barney Whitaker. He kidnaps Barney's lodge host Gibbie Gibson, bent on finding the wreck.

Gilbert Carson/Gibbie Gibson (Donald Pleasence) — A hunter and the lodge host of Barney Whitaker, he finds the plane wreck in the mountains and is the father of Sally Carson and Gibbie is eventually taken prisoner by Theo and his henchmen.

Baker (Bruno Lawrence) — A civilian and friend of Barney and Gibbie's.

Collector (Grant Tilly) — A  civilian and owner of a local pawn shop.

Harry (Harry Rutherford-Jones) — A  civilian and Sally's fiancé. It is not known what becomes of Harry when Sally falls in love with Barney Whitaker.

The Bartender (Robert Bruce) — A civilian and owner of a local bar.

Additional cast
 Tony Sparks
 Clark Walkington
 Frank Taurua
 Steve Nicolle
 Dick Jones
 Dennis Hunt

Production
The film was an original story by writer Everett De Roche, who said he got the idea from a neighbour of his in Mount Isa. It was based on a true incident about the war-time disappearance of an American DC3 military aircraft carrying the payroll for the Pacific fleet which was later discovered off Cape York. Richard Franklin was originally attached as director, and Antony I. Ginnane produced.

The script was originally set in Queensland, Australia, but the producers wanted to import four overseas actors, and Actors Equity objected. De Roche re-wrote the film so it was set in New Zealand. Richard Franklin dropped out of the film because he was unhappy with the change in location, and David Hemmings, who was attached to the film as a producer, was appointed director.

Funding was obtained privately.

The film was one of the leaders of Soviet film distribution in 1983, when it was seen by 29 million Soviet viewers.

Reception
Ginnane was so annoyed with Australia's Actors Equity that he made his next four films in New Zealand.

References

External links
 
Race for the Yankee Zephyr at Oz Movies
 Race For The Yankee Zephyr on RotaryAction.com

1981 films
1980s action drama films
1980s adventure films
1980s English-language films
Films directed by David Hemmings
New Zealand drama films
Films shot in New Zealand
Treasure hunt films
Underwater action films
Films scored by Brian May (composer)
Australian drama films
1981 drama films